Japan competed at the 2017 Asian Indoor and Martial Arts Games held in Ashgabat, Turkmenistan from September 17 to 27. Japan sent a delegation consisting of 60 competitors for the event. Japan won a total of 17 medals in the event including 2 gold medals.

Participants

Medal summary

Medal table

Medalists

References 

Nations at the 2017 Asian Indoor and Martial Arts Games
2017 in Japanese sport